Hassan Eghmaz (born 18 February 1945) is an Iranian boxer. He competed in the men's lightweight event at the 1972 Summer Olympics. At the 1972 Summer Olympics, he defeated Abdel Hady Khallaf Allah of Egypt, before losing to Ivan Mihailov of Bulgaria.

References

External links
 

1945 births
Living people
Iranian male boxers
Olympic boxers of Iran
Boxers at the 1972 Summer Olympics
Place of birth missing (living people)
Lightweight boxers
20th-century Iranian people